Bucculatrix plucheae is a moth in the family Bucculatricidae. It is found in North America, where it has been recorded from Florida. It was first described in 1963 by Annette Frances Braun.

Adults have been recorded on wing from April to May and in November.

The larvae feed on Pluchea odorata.

References

Natural History Museum Lepidoptera generic names catalog

Bucculatricidae
Moths described in 1963
Moths of North America
Taxa named by Annette Frances Braun